Arthur Knight (1916–1991) was an American movie critic, film historian, professor and TV host.

His book The Liveliest Art, first published in 1957, is a history of the cinema used as a textbook at colleges and universities throughout the world.

Early life
He graduated from City College of New York in 1940, and became an assistant film curator at the Museum of Modern Art. He served in the Army from 1941 to 1945, becoming a first lieutenant.

Film teacher
Institutions at which he taught include:
 Brooklyn Academy of Music
 City College of New York Institute of Film Techniques
 New School for Social Research
 Hunter College
 Columbia University
 UCLA
 University of Southern California
 Australian Film Television and Radio School

His former students at USC include George Lucas, Robert Zemeckis, John Carpenter and Randal Kleiser. His former film history students at the City College of New York Institute of Film Techniques include Donald Swerdlow (now Don Canaan), an award-winning journalist and film editor, Producer Michael Hertzberg, DGA-First AD - Frank Capra Award Recipient Alex Hapsas, Writer-Director David Saperstein (Cocoon).

Mehdi Tehrani (professor of film studies at the University of Tehran Fine Arts Campus and film critic) was one of his last students in 1990.

Movie critic
He reviewed movies for many publications, principally:
 The Saturday Review (1949–1973)
 The Hollywood Reporter (1973–1986)

Host and producer
He wrote, produced and hosted the 1985 cable TV series Sex in Cinema for the Playboy Channel. He was also the host of the syndicated radio series Knight at the Movies. In 1974, he was a member of the jury at the 24th Berlin International Film Festival.

Personal life
His first wife was costume designer Mary Ann Nyberg, who died in 1979. He was survived by his wife, Anne.

References

External links
 
 Arthur Knight at Yahoo! Movies
 

1916 births
1991 deaths
City College of New York alumni
American film critics
American film historians
American male non-fiction writers
Film theorists
USC School of Cinematic Arts faculty
Writers from Philadelphia
20th-century American historians
20th-century American male writers
Historians from Pennsylvania
Historians from California
American expatriates in Australia